Lumière was a restaurant on West Broadway in the Kitsilano neighbourhood of Vancouver, Canada. It was founded by Rob Feenie and Ken Wai in 1995. Feenie was the owner and chef until 2007, when he left the restaurant after a falling-out with his business partners, at which time he was replaced by Dale MacKay as head chef.

Honours

Designation
Zagat 2006 - July 2, 2006 
Most Popular Restaurant, Vancouver
AAA - 2005, 2006
5 Diamond Award
Mobile Travel Guide - 2005, 2004, 2003, 2002, 2001
4 Stars
Traditions et Qualitè - 2004
Relais & Châteaux - 2000
Relais Gourmands

Awards
Best Restaurant 2006 - April 27, 2006
Vancouver Sun, Best Restaurant Overall Award 2006 Mia Stainsby, Food Critic

Vancouver Magazine - 2005, 2004, 2003, 2002, 2001, 2000, 1999, 1998, 1997 
Critic's Poll Gold Award for Best French Restaurant

Iron Chef America - 2005 
Champion of "Battle Crab"

DiRona - 2004, 2003, 2002, 2001 
Award of Excellence

Gold Medal Plates - 2004
Voter’s Favorite- Gold Medal Dish

Vancouver Magazine - 2003, 2002, 2001, 2000, 1999, 1998, 1997
Critic’s Poll Gol Award for Restaurant of the Year

Vancouver Magazine - 2003
Critic’s Poll - Chef of the Year

Vancouver Magazine - 2000, 2001
Critic's Poll Gold Award for Best Vegetarian

Vancouver Magazine - 2000
Critic's Poll Gold Award Best use of Regional Ingredients

Vancouver International Wine Festival - 1999
Andrew Quady Dessert Competition
Gourmet Magazine - 1999
America's Top Table Reader's Poll - Top Food in Vancouver

Food Service and Hospitality Magazine - 1998
Pinnacle Award Canadian Restaurant of the Year

Vancouver Restaurant Association - 1995
Media Choice for Best New Restaurant

Reviews
Jurgen Gothe, The Vancouver Sun -  
"The kitchen is unassailable on any level and Feenie is a serious chef whose passion for cooking comes through in every dish."

Jim Poris, Senior Editor, Food Arts -  
"Rare is the chef who combines raw talent, commitment to excellence, and heartfelt generosity - the requisites for operating a world class restaurant. Rob Feenie epitomizes that rarity and Vancouver is the richer for it."

Charlie Trotter, Charlie Trotter's, Chicago -  
"Lumiere is quite possibly the finest restaurant in all of Canada."

References

Restaurants in Vancouver
2000 establishments in British Columbia
French restaurants in Canada
Defunct French restaurants